Aurano is a comune (municipality) in the Province of Verbano-Cusio-Ossola in the Italian region Piedmont, located about  northeast of Turin and about  northeast of Verbania.

Aurano borders the following municipalities: Cannero Riviera, Intragna, Miazzina, Oggebbio, Premeno, Trarego Viggiona, Valle Cannobina. Its territory is included in the National Park of Val Grande.

References

Cities and towns in Piedmont
Articles which contain graphical timelines